Kwamé Ryan (born 1970 in Toronto, Ontario) is a Trinidadian conductor.

Career

Early history and education
Ryan is the son of Joya Gomez, a school teacher and actress and Selwyn Ryan, a university professor.  Having set his sights on a career in conducting as a pre-teen, he had his primary and early musical education at the University School, St Augustine, Trinidad  and studied piano, violin and voice privately. 

Requiring wider exposure to Classical music, Ryan moved to the United Kingdom, where he attended Oakham School, in Rutland, England, and then studied Musicology at Gonville and Caius College, Cambridge and conducting with Peter Eötvös in Hungary. In Germany, Ryan attended the University of Tübingen for two years, for language and culture studies.

Conducting career
From 1999 to 2003, Ryan served as Generalmusikdirektor (General Music Director) of the Freiburg Opera and Freiburg Philharmonic Orchestra. His work there included wide-ranging operatic and concert performances, and a commercial recording of Luigi Nono's Prometeo.

In 2007, Ryan became Music Director of the Orchestre National Bordeaux Aquitaine (ONBA), holding the post until 2013. In 2008, he was also named Music Director of Orchestre Français des Jeunes, a post he held until 2011.

As a guest conductor in Germany, Ryan conducted the Radio Orchestras of Stuttgart and Bavaria, the Deutsche Kammerphilharmonie, Konzerthausorchester Berlin, Staatsoper Saarbrücken and Staatsoper Stuttgart, while in France, he worked with Opera de la Bastille, Opera de Lyon and the Orchestre Philharmonique de Radio France.  Work in the U.S and the U.K. included visits to the Symphony Orchestras of Baltimore, Dallas, Detroit, Indianapolis, Atlanta, Houston, Boston Lyric Opera, English National Opera, Scottish Chamber Orchestra, Royal Scottish Symphony and the London Philharmonia.  Other important guest conducting engagements include repeated invitations to the Seoul Philharmonic Orchestra and the BBC Proms and operatic productions for La Monnaie, Brussels and Dutch National Opera.

A passionate educator, Ryan was appointed Professor and Director of the University of Trinidad and Tobago's National Academy for the Performing Arts in 2015, focusing on youth arts and community development projects until the end of his tenure in 2022. 

Ryan then returned to the podium full-time and currently conducts worldwide as a freelancer.

Recordings
Ryan's recordings include Simplicius Simplicissimus by Karl Amadeus Hartmann with Stuttgart State Opera (2005, DVD), Vortex Temporum by Gerard Grisey and works by Salvatore Sciarrino with Ensemble Recherché, Prometeo by Luigi Nono, Neither by Feldman, Schubert's Symphony No. 9, and Rachmaninov's Symphony No. 2 (with Orchestre National Bordeaux Aquitaine).

See also
Black conductors

References

External links
 Professional website

1970 births
Male conductors (music)
Black conductors
Living people
People educated at Oakham School
Alumni of Gonville and Caius College, Cambridge
Canadian people of Trinidad and Tobago descent
Musicians from Toronto
University of Tübingen alumni
21st-century Canadian conductors (music)
21st-century Canadian male musicians
20th-century Canadian conductors (music)
20th-century Canadian male musicians